John Rees Black (born 26 January 1952) is a former Australian politician. Born in Sydney, he was a journalist and industrial advocate before entering politics. In 1984, he was elected to the Australian Senate as a Labor Senator for Queensland. He remained a Senator until his defeat in 1990. John Black chaired the Senate Inquiry into "Drugs in Sport" which reported to Parliament in May 1989.  This report provided the initial reference report on this important issue.

Career after politics
Pioneered demographic profiling of Australian political and economic groups in Australia since 1975. Developed demographic strategy for the Australian Labor Party national campaign in 1983.

In 1994, he established a demographic research and marketing group called Australian Development Strategies of which he is Founder and Executive chairman. He has been a regular commentator on Australian politics. John Black has also maintained a lifelong interest in the issue of drugs in sport and has been a founding board member of the Australian Sports Anti-Doping Agency. Black is a part-time Senior Member of the Australian Administrative Appeals Tribunal.

Currently a guest commentator for the ABC and a columnist for The Australian.

References

Australian Labor Party members of the Parliament of Australia
Members of the Australian Senate for Queensland
Members of the Australian Senate
1952 births
Living people
20th-century Australian politicians